Luis Davila (born 24 April 1954) is a Puerto Rican boxer. He competed in the men's lightweight event at the 1972 Summer Olympics. At the 1972 Summer Olympics, he lost to Guitry Bananier of France.

References

1954 births
Living people
Puerto Rican male boxers
Olympic boxers of Puerto Rico
Boxers at the 1972 Summer Olympics
Boxers at the 1971 Pan American Games
Pan American Games gold medalists for Puerto Rico
Pan American Games medalists in boxing
Place of birth missing (living people)
Lightweight boxers
Medalists at the 1971 Pan American Games